Ganzourgou is a province of Burkina Faso and is in Plateau-Central Region. The capital of Ganzourgou is Zorgho, which is along the road between Ouagadougou and Niamey, Niger. Other important localities  in the province are Mogtédo and Méguet. The population of Ganzourgou in 2019 was 481,794.

Ganzourgou is divided into 8 departments:

See also
Regions of Burkina Faso
Provinces of Burkina Faso
Departments of Burkina Faso

References

 
Provinces of Burkina Faso